The Swiss Federal Institutes of Technology are two institutes of higher education in Switzerland (part of the ETH Domain):

 Swiss Federal Institute of Technology in Lausanne (EPFL)
 Swiss Federal Institute of Technology in Zürich (ETHZ)

ETH Domain